The University of Education (initials: UE), is a public research university located in a residential area of Lahore, Punjab, Pakistan. It is a multi–campus university whose institutions and campuses are located in different metropolitan cities of Punjab province of Pakistan. Its main campus is in Township, Lahore.

Established in 2002, it offers undergraduate, post-graduate and doctoral programmes in various academic disciplines including arts and science. Approximately 13,000 students attend the university. It was ranked as one of the top institutions of higher learning in Pakistan by Higher Education Commission (HEC) in 2010.

Campuses

Lower Mall  Campus 
The university of Education Lower Mall  Campus, LAhore Came into existence in 1933 in Lahore as a Lady MAclagan Training College for women which was later became part of University of Education in September 2002.

Attock campus 
Soon after the establishment of UE, the Attock Campus introduced a B.Ed program in 2018.

Bank Road Campus Lahore 
The University of Education Bank Road Campus, Lahore, was established in 1933 in the heart of Lahore city as Lady Maclagan Training College. In 1976, the institution was named the Government College of Education for Women, Lahore. In September 2002, with the establishment of the University of Education it became one of its campuses.

Dera Ghazi Khan Campus 
The Government College of Education, D.G Khan was established in 1989.

Faisalabad campus 
The institution was established in 1961. It started in the building of Auqaaf Department on Diji Kot Road. The institution was transferred to the present campus, spread over 23 acres.
Faisalabad campus is the biggest campus of University of Education Lahore after Township campus according to departments, among 12 campuses of the university.

Jauharabad Campus 
The institution started as Johar Government Girls School. In November 1971 it obtained the status of Government College for Elementary Teachers and achieved its present status of a University of Education campus in 2004.

Vehari Campus 
The institution started as Government College for Elementary Teachers (W) Vehari in January 1998. This institute mainly focused on teacher education. After the establishment of University of Education, Lahore in August 2002, GCET (W) Vehari was entitled as University College of Education Vehari on June 22, 2005. On September 9, 2006 University College of Education Vehari was granted the status of a Campus of University of Education, Lahore.

Multan campus 

The Government Training College Multan, now one of the campuses of the University of Education Lahore, was established in 1959 but began in Bahawalpur.

U.E Multan Campus was established in 2002. It was located at Bosan Road Multan which is the heart of educational institutions.

Academic programs

Bachelor programs 

 B.Ed. Secondary (1.5 years)
 BBA
 BS Chemistry 
 BS Zoology
 BS Mathematics
 BS Information Technology
 BS Botany
 BS Computer
 BS Physics
 B.Ed. (Hons)
 BS English 
 BS Zoology 
 BS Economics and finance
 BS Economics
 BFA
 B.Ed. (Hons) Special Education

Master programs 

 MA Education Leadership and Management
 MA Education
 MSc Mathematics
 MSc Information Technology
 MSc Chemistry
 MA Urdu
 MA English
 MSc Physics
 MA Special Education
 MSc Economics
 MSc Zoology

MS/MPhil programs 

 MPhil Education
 MPhil Urdu
 MBA 3.5 / 1.5
 MS Mathematics
 MS Physics
 MS Chemistry
 MS Zoology
 MS Botany
 MPhil Educational Leadership and Policy Studies

PhD programs 

 PhD Education

References

=

Public universities and colleges in Punjab, Pakistan
Universities and colleges in Lahore
Educational institutions established in 2002
2002 establishments in Pakistan
Lahore